The Billboard Global 200 is a weekly record chart published by Billboard magazine. The chart ranks the top songs globally and is based on digital sales and online streaming from over 200 territories worldwide. First announced in mid-2019, it officially launched in September 2020.

The current number-one as of the chart dated March 18, 2023, is "Flowers" by Miley Cyrus.

Conception
Billboard had been working on the idea of a global chart for over two years prior to its launch. The chart was first announced on May 6, 2019, then envisioned as the "Global 100" and it was to launch later that year. The motivation for the chart's conception was "to expose people to music from multiple territories and in time", to provide "overdue exposure and recognition for acts from international markets". With the chart's official announcement on September 14, 2020, Billboard described it as "the first authoritative charts ranking the top songs globally", and stated that basing the chart on worldwide streams and download sales, "will give an accurate glimpse into the most popular songs on the planet".

Establishing a global chart was dependent on the availability of the data, as well as having the various streaming and digital retail services "willing to participate and provide data"; Billboard considered this "not an easy task" and the reason why it took so long to launch a global chart.

The chart officially premiered on Billboards website on September 15, 2020, for the chart week dated September 19, 2020. The first number-one song on the chart was "WAP" by Cardi B featuring Megan Thee Stallion.

Compilation

The chart methodology includes sales and streaming data from more than 200 territories. Positions are measured on a weighted formula which incorporates official streams from both subscription and ad-supported levels of top digital platforms, including both audio and video music services, and download sales from top music retailers from around the world, with sales from direct-to-consumer (D2C) sites excluded. Streams are "weighted" through paid subscriptions holding more weight than streams from free subscriptions. On the question about the increasing prevalence of fake streams that call into question whether consumers can trust the information on music streaming platforms,  Billboard explained that they "have worked closely with our data providers to implement various audit guidelines to limit any significant effect of manufactured streams. In addition, each data provider has their own safeguards in place to recognize fraudulent behavior and catch it before it gets to their data partners, including Billboard and MRC Data".

Unlike the US-based Billboard Hot 100, the Global 200 does not have a "recurrent" rule, therefore allowing songs from any period in music history to chart. The recurrent rule on the Hot 100 indicates that descending songs are removed once they fall below number 25 after 52 weeks, or once below number 50 after 20 weeks. The chart does not factor in any form of radio airplay, as, according to MRC Data, "The focus was on metrics that could be systematically measured in each country", considering how "unlike streaming and download sales, radio is not reliably measured at this time [2020] in many territories and, even if tracked, is not done consistently from country to country". As such, the chart has been noted for being similar to the Rolling Stone Top 100, which, although it is a US song chart, also incorporates only sales and streams in their chart formula.

The chart follows a "unique, revenue-reflective" methodology reflecting the global market. 
The official chart methodology is as follows:
 One track sale = 200 premium streams = 900 ad-supported
 The ad-supported to premium stream ratio is 4.5 to 1 
Each ranking is based on stream equivalent units using the following formula:
(Tracks * 200) + premium streams + (ad-supported streams / 4.5)

The chart follows a Friday–Thursday tracking week. It is compiled by MRC Data/Nielsen Music through their Music Connect product, a recently launched music measurement and analytics platform, and is published every Tuesday on Billboard.com.

Billboard Global Excl. US
Along with the Global 200, Billboard launched another, similar chart: the Billboard Global Excl. US chart. This chart follows the same formula as the Global 200, except, as the name suggests, it covers all territories excluding the US. Billboard stated their reasoning for having two charts: "One of the goals for this project was to expose people to music from multiple territories. So having each chart go 200 titles deep and also presenting a view of titles excluding U.S. influence was of great importance to us". The first number-one song for the chart dated September 19, 2020, was "Hawái" by Maluma.

Song milestones

Most weeks at number one on the Global 200

Biggest drops from number one on the Global 200

 Mariah Carey's "All I Want for Christmas Is You" became the first song to fall completely off the Global 200 from the number-one position in the January 16, 2021, issue of Billboard.

Biggest single-week downward movements on the Global 200

Most weeks at number one on the Global 200 Excl. US

Biggest drops from number one on the Global 200 Excl. US

Artist achievements

Most number-one singles

Most weeks at number one

Most top ten entries

Most total entries

Most single-week entries

Most number-one singles on the Global 200 Excl. US

Most weeks at number one on the Global 200 Excl. US

Most top ten entries on the Global 200 Excl. US

Most total entries on the Global 200 Excl. US

Simultaneously topping Global 200, Global 200 Excl. US and Hot 100

 BTS is the first act to top the Global 200, Global 200 Excl. US and Hot 100 charts simultaneously. They are also the only act to achieve this feat with five songs. Ariana Grande is the first female artist to top all three charts. Justin Bieber, Daniel Caesar and Giveon are the first male soloists to do so. Sam Smith is the first non-binary artist to do so.

Simultaneously topping Global 200, Global 200 Excl. US and Billboard 200

 BTS is the first act to top the Global 200, Global 200 Excl. US and Billboard 200 charts simultaneously. Justin Bieber is the first male artist to achieve this feat. Taylor Swift is the first female artist to do so. She is also the only artist to top all three charts with two different songs and for multiple weeks.

References

External links
 Current chart at Billboard.com

Global 200
Top lists
2020 establishments in the United States
Global culture